The International Center for Tropical Agriculture (known as CIAT from its 
Spanish-language name Centro Internacional de Agricultura Tropical) is an international research and development organization dedicated to reducing poverty and hunger while protecting natural resources in developing countries. It is based in Palmira, Colombia, where it employs over 300 scientists.

CIAT is one of the 15 specialized research centers of the Consultative Group on International Agricultural Research (CGIAR) and is also the headquarters for the CGIAR Research Program on Climate Change, Agriculture and Food Security (CCAFS).

In 2019, CIAT joined with Bioversity International (as the Alliance of Bioversity International and CIAT) to "deliver research-based solutions that harness agricultural biodiversity and sustainably transform food systems to improve people’s lives".

Grain legume research
CIAT has a seed depository of 37,000 varieties of beans at a center in Colombia and, as of 2013, was engaged in research on developing better varieties of grain legumes. The goals are tolerances to drought, low phosphorus soils, and heat; in addition to improved nitrogen fixation. CIAT coordinated the activities of the Pan-Africa Bean Research Alliance (PABRA) in 29 countries in Sub-Saharan Africa. This effort was supported by the Canadian International Development Agency (CIDA)

See also
Bioversity International
International Institute of Tropical Agriculture

References

External links
International Center for Tropical Agriculture
CCAFS

International research institutes
Research institutes in Colombia
Agricultural research institutes
Agricultural organisations based in Colombia
Organizations with year of establishment missing